Events from the year 1811 in Sweden

Incumbents
 Monarch – Charles XIII

Events

 June - The peasant rebellion Klågerupskravallerna takes place in the province of Scania. 
 - The Royal Swedish Academy of Agriculture and Forestry is founded. 
 - The Crown Princess, Désirée Clary, leaves Sweden for France, where she lives estranged from her spouse until 1823.
 - The creation of the Order of Charles XIII. 
 - Married businesswomen are granted the right to make decisions about their own businesses without their husband's consent.

Births
 31 August – Adolfina Fägerstedt, ballerina (d. 1902)
 1 September – Richard Dybeck jurist, antiquarian, and lyricist  (died 1877)
 17 September – August Blanche journalist, novelist, and a socialist politician (died 1868)
 Malla Höök, actress and courtesan (died 1882)

Deaths

 5 August – Adolf Ulrik Wertmüller, painter  (born 1751)
 14 September - Johanna Löfblad, Swedish actor and singer (born 1733)

References

 
Years of the 19th century in Sweden
Sweden